Edward Story (or Storey; died 1503) was an English priest, Bishop of Carlisle, 1468–1477, and Bishop of Chichester, 1477–1503.

Story was educated at Pembroke Hall, Cambridge, where he was elected a fellow about 1444. In 1450, he was appointed Master of Michaelhouse, Cambridge, a post he held together with his later preferments until 1477.  Advanced to the see  of Carlisle  by papal provision on 18 July 1468, he was consecrated a bishop on 2 October 1468. He was translated to Chichester on 11 February 1478. He served as chaplain to Elizabeth Woodville and as Chancellor of Cambridge University. He founded the Prebendal School in Chichester, and he is reputed to have had the Chichester Cross erected.

Story died on 16 March 1503. His death is recorded in the Lewkenor Hours (Lambeth Palace Library MS 545), the book of hours once owned by the wealthy Lewkenor family of Tratton and Tangmere (Sussex).

Citations

References
 
 

15th-century births
1503 deaths
Chancellors of the University of Cambridge
Bishops of Carlisle
Bishops of Chichester
Alumni of Pembroke College, Cambridge
Fellows of Pembroke College, Cambridge
15th-century English Roman Catholic bishops

16th-century English Roman Catholic bishops

Year of birth unknown